Ivy Claire Amoko is a Ugandan chess player. In 2014 she was the first woman to become a Woman Fide Master in East Africa.

Early life 
Amoko was born to Stella Arach-Amoko and Idule Amoko. She attended Shimoni Demonstration School for primary and later St Joseph’s Nsambya (O-level) and Nabisunsa Girls (A-level).

Chess career 
Amoko started playing chess in 2007. 

She was a gold medal winner for chess in the Inter-University Games in 2007 and 2008, playing for Makerere University. 

In 2012, Amoko and Phiona Mutesi were awarded the title of Woman Candidate Master after scoring the required 50% from nine games at the 40th Chess Olympiad in Istanbul, Turkey. This made them the first titled female players in Ugandan chess history.

Amoko won on her debut in Rwabushenyi Memorial Chess tournament in the Females category in 2014, after winning all eight of her tournament games, capturing the title from Phiona Mutesi. 

At the close of the 41st Chess Olympiad in Tromsø in 2014, Amoko was elevated to Woman Fide Master; she was the first woman to achieve this title in East Africa.

She currently plays with the Kireka Panthers Chess Club, in the Uganda Chess League.

References 

Living people
1987 births
21st-century Ugandan lawyers
Ugandan women lawyers
Ugandan chess players
Ugandan female chess players
Chess Woman FIDE Masters
Ugandan women
Makerere University alumni